Builder may refer to:

 Construction worker, who specializes in building work
 Carpenter, a skilled craftsman who works with wood
 General contractor, that specializes in building work
 Subcontractor
 Builder (detergent), a component of modern detergents
 Bob the Builder, a British preschool animated television programme
 Real estate developer, who causes buildings to be constructed
 Builder (hockey), in ice hockey, manages or builds the game
 Builder (United States Navy), U.S. Navy Rating
 Builder pattern, an object-oriented design pattern
 Interactive Scenario Builder, an RF Tactical Decision Aid often referred to as Builder
 Build engineer, a software engineer specializing in builds (versions) of large software products

Names 
 Builders (film), a 1942 British propaganda film
 The Builder (film), 2010 film
 The Builder, British magazine now known as Building
 Builder, American magazine published by Zonda Home
 "The Builder" (short story), a 1953 short story by Philip K. Dick
 "The Builders", an episode in the 1970s British television comedy Fawlty Towers
 The Institute of Builders, British professional society
 Builders, international music group also known as The Bilders, Bilderbergers and Bilderine

See also
 
 
 Buildering, rock-climbing on the outside of a building
 Constructor (disambiguation)
 C++Builder
 World Builder (disambiguation)
 Build (disambiguation),